Leutnant Kurt Küppers was a World War I flying ace credited with six aerial victories.

Biography

Early life
Kurt Küppers was born in 1894, birthplace unknown. An early interest in aviation led him to gain pilot's license No. 492, granted on 22 August 1913.

Service in military aviation

Küppers was serving in the Luftstreitkräfte when World War I began. However, his first known assignment was as a pilot of two-seater reconnaissance aircraft in the vicinity of Dunkirk in 1916. After that, he served on the Eastern Front with Flieger-Abteilung (Flier Detachment) 45, a recon unit. Although it goes unmentioned in records, he must have undergone fighter pilot's training, because his next posting was to a fighter squadron, Jagdstaffel 6 (Jasta 6), in March 1917. Between 16 March and 12 July 1917, he scored four aerial victories.

However, in August 1917, Küppers transferred to Kampfstaffel (Tactical Bomber Squadron) 14 as a bomber pilot; there he flew a Gotha bomber to convey his friend Fritz Lorenz on several raids on England. Küppers returned to Jasta 6 in October. He scored his fifth credited aerial victory on 23 November 1917.

On 16 December 1917, he was tasked to form and command a new fighter squadron, Jagdstaffel 48 (Jasta 48). On 6 March 1918, he scored his sixth and final victory. He remained in command of Jasta 48 until he was relieved from combat on 23 August 1918.

Later life

Having won the Iron Cross First Class, Kurt Küppers survived World War I to slip into obscurity. He is known to have died on 24 June 1971.

Footnote

Sources of information

References
 Franks, Norman; Bailey, Frank W.; Guest, Russell. Above the Lines: The Aces and Fighter Units of the German Air Service, Naval Air Service and Flanders Marine Corps, 1914–1918. Grub Street, 1993. , .

1894 births
1971 deaths
German World War I flying aces
Recipients of the Iron Cross (1914), 1st class